The Official NZ Top 40 was a NZ made music countdown television show which is a countdown of the New Zealand Singles Chart music. It uses the official chart produced by the Recording Industry Association of New Zealand. While the RIANZ charts are published for the week ending Monday, and published on Tuesday, The Official NZ Top 40 shows on Saturday evenings usually at 6pm unless changed due to other events. The Official NZ Top 40 is also replayed on C4 again on Tuesday from 2pm to 4pm which is an extended version of the show. The only change is the show will start showing most videos in full if applicable.

Format
All of the 40 singles in the chart are named, with excerpts of their music videos (if they have them). Some songs have their entire music videos played. The top 5 albums are also listed. Number-one singles from other countries (including Australia, the UK and the US) are shown, too.

See also
 Recording Industry Association of New Zealand
 C4

2003 New Zealand television series debuts
2010 New Zealand television series endings
C4 (New Zealand TV channel) original programming
Music chart shows
New Zealand music television series